Stefan Nikolić (Serbian Cyrillic: Стефан Николић; born 14 March 1994) is a Serbian professional footballer who plays as a right-back.

Career

Mladost Podgorica
Nikolić is a product of the Red Star Belgrade and Vojvodina academy. Although he played successfully for the youth team's first eleven on the right-back position, Nikolić failed to secure a first team contract. He signed his first professional contract with Montenegrin side Mladost Podgorica. However, he was released after only 6 months at the club, appearing in only two league matches.

Vojvodina
In bizarre twist of events, Nikolić was invited to a trial at Vojvodina, due to club's new policy to focus on youth players from its own academy. He secured a two-year-deal at his old club. He made his debut for Vojvodina on 13 April 2014, under manager Branko Babić, in a 1–0 home loss against Rad. While at Vojvodina, Nikolić won the 2013–14 Serbian Cup. He was released from the club at the end of the 2014–15 season.

OFK Bačka
In early July 2015, Nikolić signed with OFK Bačka on a free transfer. He left Bačka in late 2017.

Krupa
In March 2018, Nikolić signed a contract with Bosnian Premier League club Krupa. He was part of the Krupa team that played in the 2017–18 Bosnian Cup final against Željezničar, losing both final matches. Nikolić got relegated with Krupa back to the First League of RS in the 2018–19 season, but got promoted back to the Bosnian Premier League in the next season, though after the season was ended abruptly due to the COVID-19 pandemic in Bosnia and Herzegovina, after which, by default, Krupa were crowned league champions and got promoted. He terminated his contract with the club on 19 December 2020.

Honours
Vojvodina
Serbian Cup: 2013–14
Krupa
First League of RS: 2019–20

References

External links

1994 births
Living people
Footballers from Belgrade
Serbian footballers
Serbian expatriate footballers
Expatriate footballers in Montenegro
Expatriate footballers in Bosnia and Herzegovina
Montenegrin First League players
Serbian SuperLiga players
Serbian First League players
Premier League of Bosnia and Herzegovina players
First League of the Republika Srpska players
OFK Titograd players
FK Vojvodina players
OFK Bačka players
FK Krupa players
Association football fullbacks